Amritha Aiyer (born 14 May 1994) is an Indian actress who predominantly appears in Tamil and Telugu language films. She made her acting debut in the Tamil film Padaiveeran (2018), and her Telugu debut with Red (2021).

Early life 
Aiyer was born in Bengaluru, Karnataka. She completed her Bachelor of Commerce degree from St. Joseph's College of Commerce. She then became a model and pursued her career as an actress in Tamil and Telugu Languages.

Career 
Aiyer appeared in several uncredited roles, in Lingaa (2014), Tenaliraman (2014), Pokkiri Raja (2016) and Theri (2016).

She made her debut as lead actress in Padaiveeran (2018) opposite Vijay Yesudas, where she played the role of Malar. In response to her role, a reviewer of the film from The Hindu stated that "Amritha fits in her role aptly". She later played a lead role opposite Vijay Antony in Kaali (2018). She played the role of Thendral, the Tamil Nadu football team captain, in Atlee's Bigil (2019), alongside Vijay.

In 2021, Aiyer made her Telugu debut in Red, opposite Ram Pothineni, and directed by Kishore Tirumala. Her second release was Vanakkam Da Mappilei opposite G. V. Prakash Kumar, a film released directly via Sun NXT,. The film received mixed and negative reviews. Her third release was Lift, the film opt for the theatrical release and directly released via Disney+ Hotstar. The film received mixed to highly positive reviews from the critics.And her last release was Arjuna Phalguna opposite Sree Vishnu, the film received mixed reviews from critics.

Her only release in 2022, was a Tamil film Coffee with Kadhal opposite Jai. The film received mixed to negative reviews from critics, and was a failure at the box-office.

As of December 2022, Aiyer is shooting for her upcoming Telugu film Hanu Man opposite Teja Sajja. and an untitled Tamil-Telugu bilingual film, opposite Teejay Arunachalam.

Filmography

Short films

References

External links 

 
 

Living people
Actresses from Tamil Nadu
Actresses in Tamil cinema
Indian film actresses
21st-century Indian actresses
Actresses in Malayalam cinema
St. Joseph's College, Bangalore alumni
1994 births